Peter Samuel Dempsey (born 31 March 1986) is an Irish racing driver from Ashbourne, County Meath.

Dempsey began his pro career in Formula BMW UK in 2004, finishing 22nd. In 2005 he finished second in the Formula Ford Walter Hayes Trophy race and won the BRDC Golden Helmet. In 2006 he finished third in Formula Ford UK and won the Walter Hayes Trophy. In 2007 he won both the Golden Helmet and Walter Hayes Trophy. 2008 saw Dempsey move to the United States to race in Star Mazda for Andersen Racing where he won four races and finished third in points. He also made two starts in the F2000 Championship Series. In 2009 he finished second in Star Mazda for AIM Autosport. He had no full-time drive in 2010 but participated in one American Le Mans Series race (the 2010 Petit Le Mans) and a number of high-profile Formula Ford races in the UK.

Dempsey signed on race in the Firestone Indy Lights series for O2 Racing Technology in 2011. The team left the series amid controversy at the Milwaukee Mile race and missed one race weekend before signing on with Andretti Autosport to continue the season.

He signed on to return to Indy Lights to race in the 2012 Freedom 100 and the remainder of the 2012 Indy Lights season with Younessi Racing. However, the team left the series after the Detroit race. He was later in the season picked up by Belardi Auto Racing for the last five races of the season and captured three top-5 finishes in those races. He finished 11th in points, ultimately competing in 7 of the 12 races. He returns to Belardi in 2013 for a full season in Indy Lights.

Peter Dempsey captured his first Indy Lights win in the 2013 Freedom 100 in the closest finish in Indianapolis Motor Speedway history (0.0026 secs) in a four-wide finish.

Racing record

American open–wheel racing results 
(key)

Star Mazda Championship

Indy Lights

References

1986 births
Irish racing drivers
Formula Ford drivers
Formula BMW UK drivers
Indy Pro 2000 Championship drivers
Indy Lights drivers
Sportspeople from Dublin (city)
Living people
Belardi Auto Racing drivers
Juncos Hollinger Racing drivers
Andretti Autosport drivers
Team Moore Racing drivers